Computer Sciences Corporation (CSC) was an American multinational corporation that provided information technology (IT) services and professional services. On April 3, 2017, it merged with the Enterprise Services line of business of HP Enterprise (formerly Electronic Data Systems) to create DXC Technology.

History
CSC was founded in April 1959 in Los Angeles, California, by Roy Nutt and Fletcher Jones. CSC initially provided programming tools such as assembler and compiler software.

In the 1960s, CSC provided software programming services to major computer manufacturers like IBM and Honeywell and secured their first contracts for the U.S. public sector with NASA (among others).

By 1963, CSC became the largest software company in the United States and the first software company to be listed on the American Stock Exchange. By the end of 1968, CSC was listed on the New York Stock Exchange and had operations in Canada, India, the United Kingdom, Germany, Spain, Italy, Brazil, and the Netherlands.

In 1967, CSC set up Computicket Corp. to compete in the fledgling electronic ticket market competing with Ticketron but lost $13 million and discontinued the service in 1970.

In the 1970s and 1980s, CSC expanded globally winning large contracts for the finance and defense industries and through acquisitions in Europe and Australia.

In 2000 CSC founded a joint-venture called Innovative Banking Solutions AG in Wiesbaden, Germany to market their newly developed SAP solution for mortgage companies.

Since its beginnings in 1959, company headquarters had been in California.  On March 29, 2008, the corporate headquarters of the company were relocated from El Segundo, California, to Falls Church, Virginia.
CSC has been a Fortune 500 Company since 1995, coming in at 162 in the 2012 rankings.

In fiscal 2013, CSC acquired ServiceMesh (cloud management) for $282M, Infochimps (a big data platform) for $27M, 42Six (analytics for national intelligence) for $35 million, iSOFT (application solutions) for cash and debt, and AppLabs (application testing) for $171M.

In May 2015, CSC announced plans to split the public sector business from its commercial and international business.  In August, it was announced that CSC's Government Service business would merge with SRA International to form a new company — CSRA—at the end of November 2015.

In July 2015, CSC and HCL Technologies announced the signing of a joint venture agreement to form a banking software and services company, Celeriti FinTech.

In September 2015, CSC closed the acquisition of Fixnetix, a provider of front-office managed trading solutions in capital markets. CSC also acquired Fruition Partners, a provider of technology-enabled solutions for the service-management sector during the month.

In December 2015, business technology and services provider, Xchanging, agreed to be purchased by CSC.

In February 2016, CSC announced it was moving its headquarters to Tysons, Fairfax County's central business district, just a few miles from Annandale, Virginia.

On April 3, 2017, it merged with  HPE Enterprise Services to create DXC Technology.

Business
CSC once ranked among the leading IT service providers in the world. Geographically, CSC had major operations throughout North America, Europe, Asia, and Australia.

The company operated in three broad service lines or sectors until the 2015 divestment of NPS, its public sector:

 North American Public Sector (NPS): Since 1961, CSC had been one of the major IT service providers for the  U.S. federal government. CSC provided services to the United States Department of Defense, law enforcement and intelligence agencies  (FBI, CIA, Homeland Security), aeronautics and aerospace agencies  (NASA). In 2012, U.S. federal contracts accounted for 36% of CSC total revenue.  
 Managed Services  
 Business Solutions and Services

The company  made several acquisitions, including DynCorp in 2003 and Covansys Corporation in 2007.

Awards and recognition
 In September 2012, CSC was ranked 8th in Software Magazine’s Software 500 ranking of the world’s largest software and service providers.

Criticism
 In June 2013, Margaret Hodge, chair of the Public Accounts Committee, a Select committee of the British House of Commons, described CSC as a "rotten company providing a hopeless system" with reference to their multibillion-pound contract to deliver the National Programme for IT Lorenzo contract. 
 In February 2011, the U.S. Securities and Exchange Commission (SEC) launched a fraud investigation into CSC's accounting practices in Denmark and Australian business. CSC's CFO Mike Mancuso confirmed that accounting errors and intentional misconduct by certain personnel in Australia prompted SEC regulators to turn their gaze to Australia. Mancuso also stated that the alleged misconduct includes  in both intentional accounting irregularities and unintentional accounting errors. The SEC accused the former CEO Mike Laphen of fraud and clawed back $4,35 million 
 The company was accused of breaching human rights by arranging several illegal rendition flights for the CIA between 2003 and 2006, which also led to criticism of shareholders of the company, including the governments of Norway and Britain.
 The company engaged in a number of activities that resulted in legal actions against it. These are:
 Its so-called WorldBridge Service (Visa Services), which processed and issued millions of visa applications to enter Britain, did not involve British authorities.
 In 1998, CSC was the prime contractor hired by the Internal Revenue Service to modernize its tax-filing system. They told the IRS it would meet a January 2006 deadline, but failed to do so, leaving the IRS with no system capable of detecting fraud.

See also
 VP/MS (Visual Product Modeling System), a modeling language and product lifecycle management tool by CSC
 Top 100 US Federal Contractors
 CSRA Inc., formed by a merger of CSC's North American Public Sector and SRA International 
 Team CSC and other names 2003-2010. Professional cycling sponsorship under team owner Bjarne Riis.

References

External links
 
 Computer Sciences Corporation SEC Filings

1959 establishments in California
2017 disestablishments in California
2017 mergers and acquisitions
American companies established in 1959
American companies disestablished in 2017
Call centre companies
Companies based in Fairfax County, Virginia
Companies listed on the New York Stock Exchange
Computer companies established in 1959
Computer companies disestablished in 2017
Defunct companies based in Virginia
Defunct computer companies of the United States
Defunct computer hardware companies
Information technology companies of the United States
International information technology consulting firms
International management consulting firms
Business process outsourcing companies of the United States
Software companies established in 1959
Software companies disestablished in 2017
Technology companies based in Greater Los Angeles
Technology companies established in 1959
Technology companies disestablished in 2017